The 141st meridian east of Greenwich is a line of longitude that extends from the North Pole across the Arctic Ocean, Asia, the Pacific Ocean, Australasia, the Indian Ocean, the Southern Ocean, and Antarctica to the South Pole.

The 141st meridian east forms a great circle with the 39th meridian west.

As a border
On the island of New Guinea, the meridian defines part of the land border between Indonesia on the west and Papua New Guinea on the east.  The Fly River forms the border where it flows west of the 141st meridian.  South of the Fly, the border runs slightly to the east of, and parallel to, the meridian (see Indonesia–Papua New Guinea border).

In Australia, it forms the eastern boundary of the state of South Australia, bordering Queensland and New South Wales.

From Pole to Pole
Starting at the North Pole and heading south to the South Pole, the 141st meridian east passes through:

{| class="wikitable plainrowheaders"
! scope="col" width="130" | Co-ordinates
! scope="col" | Country, territory or sea
! scope="col" | Notes
|-
| style="background:#b0e0e6;" | 
! scope="row" style="background:#b0e0e6;" | Arctic Ocean
| style="background:#b0e0e6;" |
|-
| 
! scope="row" | 
| Sakha Republic — Kotelny Island, New Siberian Islands
|-
| style="background:#b0e0e6;" | 
! scope="row" style="background:#b0e0e6;" | East Siberian Sea
| style="background:#b0e0e6;" | Sannikov Strait
|-
| 
! scope="row" | 
| Sakha Republic — Little Lyakhovsky Island, New Siberian Islands
|-
| style="background:#b0e0e6;" | 
! scope="row" style="background:#b0e0e6;" | East Siberian Sea
| style="background:#b0e0e6;" | Sannikov Strait
|-
| 
! scope="row" | 
| Sakha Republic — Great Lyakhovsky Island, New Siberian Islands
|-
| style="background:#b0e0e6;" | 
! scope="row" style="background:#b0e0e6;" | East Siberian Sea
| style="background:#b0e0e6;" | Laptev Strait
|-valign="top"
| 
! scope="row" | 
| Sakha Republic Khabarovsk Krai — from 
|-
| style="background:#b0e0e6;" | 
! scope="row" style="background:#b0e0e6;" | Laptev Sea
| style="background:#b0e0e6;" |
|-
| 
! scope="row" | 
| Khabarovsk Krai
|-
| style="background:#b0e0e6;" | 
! scope="row" style="background:#b0e0e6;" | Sea of Okhotsk
| style="background:#b0e0e6;" |
|-
| 
! scope="row" | 
| Khabarovsk Krai
|-valign="top"
| style="background:#b0e0e6;" | 
! scope="row" style="background:#b0e0e6;" | Strait of Tartary
| style="background:#b0e0e6;" | Passing just west of Moneron Island, Sakhalin Oblast,  (at )
|-
| 
! scope="row" | 
| Hokkaidō Prefecture — Rebun Island
|-
| style="background:#b0e0e6;" | 
! scope="row" style="background:#b0e0e6;" | Sea of Japan
| style="background:#b0e0e6;" |
|-
| 
! scope="row" | 
| Hokkaidō Prefecture — island of Hokkaidō (passing through Otaru)
|-
| style="background:#b0e0e6;" | 
! scope="row" style="background:#b0e0e6;" | Pacific Ocean
| style="background:#b0e0e6;" | Uchiura Bay
|-
| 
! scope="row" | 
| Hokkaidō Prefecture — Oshima Peninsula, island of Hokkaidō 
|-
| style="background:#b0e0e6;" | 
! scope="row" style="background:#b0e0e6;" | Tsugaru Strait
| style="background:#b0e0e6;" |
|-
| 
! scope="row" | 
| Aomori Prefecture — Shimokita Peninsula, island of Honshū
|-
| style="background:#b0e0e6;" | 
! scope="row" style="background:#b0e0e6;" | Mutsu Bay
| style="background:#b0e0e6;" |
|-
| 
! scope="row" | 
| Island of Honshū— Aomori Prefecture— Iwate Prefecture — from — Miyagi Prefecture — from 
|-
| style="background:#b0e0e6;" | 
! scope="row" style="background:#b0e0e6;" | Pacific Ocean
| style="background:#b0e0e6;" | Sendai Bay
|-
| 
! scope="row" | 
| Fukushima Prefecture, island of Honshū
|-valign="top"
| style="background:#b0e0e6;" | 
! scope="row" style="background:#b0e0e6;" | Pacific Ocean
| style="background:#b0e0e6;" | Passing just east of the island of Nishinoshima, Tokyo Prefecture,  (at )
|-valign="top"
| 
! scope="row" |  /  border
|
|-
| 
! scope="row" | 
| The border diverts west to follow the Fly River
|-valign="top"
| 
! scope="row" | 
|-
| style="background:#b0e0e6;" | 
! scope="row" style="background:#b0e0e6;" | Arafura Sea
| style="background:#b0e0e6;" |
|-
| style="background:#b0e0e6;" | 
! scope="row" style="background:#b0e0e6;" | Gulf of Carpentaria
| style="background:#b0e0e6;" |
|-valign="top"
| 
! scope="row" | 
|-
| style="background:#b0e0e6;" | 
! scope="row" style="background:#b0e0e6;" | Indian Ocean
| style="background:#b0e0e6;" | Australian authorities consider this to be part of the Southern Ocean
|-
| style="background:#b0e0e6;" | 
! scope="row" style="background:#b0e0e6;" | Southern Ocean
| style="background:#b0e0e6;" |
|-
| 
! scope="row" | Antarctica
| Adélie Land, claimed by 
|-
|}

See also
140th meridian east
142nd meridian east
Treaty of Zaragoza

References

e141 meridian east
Indonesia–Papua New Guinea border
Borders of Queensland
Borders of South Australia
Borders of New South Wales